The 2012–13 season was Arbroath's second consecutive season in the Scottish Second Division, having been promoted from the Scottish Third Division at the end of the 2010–11 season. Arbroath also competed in the Challenge Cup, League Cup and the Scottish Cup.

Summary

Season
Arbroath finished fifth in the Scottish Second Division. They reached the Semi-final of the Challenge Cup, the second round of the League Cup and the fourth round of the Scottish Cup, losing to eventual champions Celtic.

Results & fixtures

Pre season

Scottish Second Division

Scottish Challenge Cup

Scottish League Cup

Scottish Cup

Player statistics

Squad 
Last updated 11 May 2013

|}

Disciplinary record
Includes all competitive matches.
Last updated 11 May 2013

Team statistics

League table

Division summary

Transfers

Players in

Players out

References

Arbroath F.C. seasons
Arbroath